Safa may refer to:

Organizations
 Al Safa FC, sports club in the Eastern Province of Saudi Arabia
 Safa SC, an association football club in Lebanon
Safa WFC, a women's association football club in Lebanon
 South African Football Association, national governing body for association football in the Republic of South Africa
 South Australian Football Association, a defunct Australian rules football competition that ran from 1978-95.
 Scottish Amateur Football Association, governing body for amateur football in Scotland
 SAFA (architecture), professional body representing architects in Finland

People

People with the given name
 Safa Giray (1931–2011), Turkish civil engineer and politician
 Safa Haeri (1937–2016), Iranian–French journalist
 Safa Khulusi (1917–1995), Iraqi historian, novelist, poet, journalist and broadcaster
 Safa al-Safi (fl. 2006–2011), Iraqi politician

People with the surname
 Peyami Safa (1899–1961), Turkish man of letters
 Iskandar Safa (born 1955), Lebanese–French businessman
 Saman Safa (born 1985), Iranian football player
 Zabihollah Safa (1911–1999), Iranian scholar and professor

Places
 Safa and Marwah, two small hills in Saudi Arabia
 Safa, North Khorasan, a village in North Khorasan Province, Iran
 Safa Park, a park in Dubai, United Arab Emirates
 Safa Stadium, a multi-use stadium in Beirut, Lebanon
 Khirbet Safa, a Palestinian village near Hebron, West Bank
 Nebi Safa, a village in Lebanon

Other
 Safa, a style of pagri (turban)
 Safa, a god of the hearth chain in Ossetian mythology

See also
 Al-Safa (disambiguation)
 SAFA (disambiguation)
 Saffa (disambiguation)